Dublin St Patrick's, a division of Dublin, was a borough constituency in Ireland. It returned one Member of Parliament (MP) to the United Kingdom House of Commons from 1885 until 1922.

From the dissolution of 1922, the area was no longer represented in the UK Parliament.

Boundaries
This constituency was named for St Patrick's Cathedral and comprised the southwest part of the city of Dublin.

From 1885 to 1918, it was defined as:

From 1918 to 1922, it was defined as:

History
Prior to the 1885 general election, the city was the undivided two-member Dublin City constituency. Under the Redistribution of Seats Act 1885, Dublin was divided into four divisions: St Patrick's, College Green, Dublin Harbour and St Stephen's Green.

Under the Redistribution of Seats (Ireland) Act 1918, the city was allocated seven seats: in addition to the four existing constituencies, the new divisions were Clontarf, St James's and St Michan's. St Patrick's lost territory to St James's.

Sinn Féin used this election to elect members of Dáil Éireann, inviting all those elected in Ireland to sit as a Teachta Dála (known in English as a Deputy) in the Dáil, although only the Sinn Féin members attended. St Patrick's in 1918 gave Sinn Féin 63% of the vote. Constance Markievicz was the first woman to win a parliamentary election in Britain and Ireland, at the first election where women were permitted to stand as candidates.

Under the Government of Ireland Act 1920, the area was combined with the St Stephen's Green Division to form City South, a 4-seat constituency for the Southern Ireland House of Commons and a single constituency at Westminster. At the 1921 election for the Southern Ireland House of Commons, the four seats were won uncontested by Sinn Féin, who treated it as part of the election to the Second Dáil. Constance Markievicz was one of the four TDs for Dublin City South.

Under s. 1(4) of the Irish Free State (Agreement) Act 1922, no writ was to be issued "for a constituency in Ireland other than a constituency in Northern Ireland". Therefore, no vote was held in Dublin City South at the 1922 United Kingdom general election on 15 November 1922, shortly before the Irish Free State left the United Kingdom on 6 December 1922.

Members of Parliament

Elections

Elections in the 1880s

Elections in the 1890s

Elections in the 1900s

Elections in the 1910s

Notes, citations and sources

Citations

Sources

External links
Oireachtas Members Database
Dublin Historic Maps: Parliamentary & Dail Constituencies 1780–1969 (a work in progress)

Westminster constituencies in County Dublin (historic)
Dáil constituencies in County Dublin (historic)
Constituencies of the Parliament of the United Kingdom established in 1885
Constituencies of the Parliament of the United Kingdom disestablished in 1922